Kittanning may refer to:

 Kittanning, Pennsylvania, United States
 West Kittanning, Pennsylvania, United States
 Kittanning Township, Armstrong County, Pennsylvania, United States
 Kittanning (village), a Native American village that was located at the site of the present-day borough in Pennsylvania, United States
 Kittanning Coal, coal seams in the Kittanning cyclothem of the Pennsylvanian Epoch
 Kittanning Expedition, a raid during the French and Indian War that led to the destruction of the American Indian village of Kittanning
 Kittanning Gap, a gap at the summit of Allegheny Ridge in Central Pennsylvania, United States
 Kittanning Path, a major east-west Native American trail used during the 18th century in Western Pennsylvania, United States
 Kittanning Citizens Bridge, a through truss bridge in Kittanning, Pennsylvania, United States
 Clear Creek State Forest, a Pennsylvania State Forest in Pennsylvania Bureau of Forestry District #8, formerly known as "Kittanning State Forest"
 USS Kittanning (YTB-787), a United States Navy large harbor tug

See also 
 
 Katanning, Western Australia